Pilaf (US spelling) or pilau (UK spelling) is a rice dish, or in some regions, a wheat dish, whose recipe usually involves cooking in stock or broth, adding spices, and other ingredients such as vegetables or meat, and employing some technique for achieving cooked grains that do not adhere to each other.

At the time of the Abbasid Caliphate, such methods of cooking rice at first spread through a vast territory  from India to Spain, and eventually to a wider world. The Spanish paella, and the South Asian pilau or pulao, and biryani, evolved from such dishes.

Pilaf and similar dishes are common to Balkan, Caribbean, South Caucasian, Central Asian, East African, Eastern European, Latin American, Middle Eastern, and South Asian cuisines. It is a staple food and a popular dish in Afghanistan, Albania, Armenia, Azerbaijan, Bangladesh, Bulgaria, China (notably in Xinjiang), Cyprus, Georgia, Greece (notably in Crete), India, Iraq (notably in Kurdistan), Iran, Israel, Kazakhstan, Kenya, Kyrgyzstan, Mongolia, Nepal, Pakistan, Romania, Russia, Serbia, Sri Lanka, Tanzania (notably in Zanzibar), Tajikistan, Turkey, Turkmenistan, Uganda, and Uzbekistan.

Etymology
According to the Oxford English Dictionary, Third Edition (2006) the English word pilaf, which is the later and North American English  form, is a borrowing from Turkish, its etymon, or linguistic ancestor, the Turkish pilav, whose etymon is the Persian pilāv; "pilaf" is found more commonly in North American dictionaries than pilau.

The British and Commonwealth English spelling, pilau, has etymon Persian pulaw (in form palāv, pilāv, or pulāv in the 16th century), whose line of descent is: Hindi pulāv (dish of rice and meat), Sanskrit pulāka (ball of rice), which in turn is probably of Dravidian descent.

History

Although the cultivation of rice had spread much earlier from South Asia to Central and West Asia, it was at the time of the Abbasid Caliphate that methods of cooking rice which approximate modern styles of cooking pilaf at first spread through a vast territory  from Spain to Afghanistan, and eventually to a wider world. The Spanish paella, and the South Asian pilau or pulao, and biryani, evolved from such dishes.

According to author K. T. Achaya, the Indian epic Mahabharata mentions an instance of rice and meat cooked together. Also, according to Achaya, "pulao" or "pallao" is used to refer to a rice dish in ancient Sanskrit works such as the Yājñavalkya Smṛti. However, according to food writers Colleen Taylor Sen and Charles Perry, and social theorist Ashis Nandy, these references do not substantially correlate to  the  commonly used meaning and history implied in pilafs, which appear in Indian accounts after the medieval Central Asian conquests.<ref> Quote: " (p. 11) Not merely ingredients came to the subcontinent, but also recipes. ... All around India one finds preparations that came originally from outside South Asia. Kebabs came from West and Central Asia and underwent radical metamorphosis in the hot and dusty plains of India. So did biryani and pulao, two rice preparations, usually with meat. Without them, ceremonial dining in many parts of India, Pakistan, and Bangladesh is incomplete. Even the term pulao or pilav seems to have come from Arabic and Persian. It is true that in Sanskrit — in the Yajnavalkya Smriti — and in old Tamil, the term pulao occurs (Achaya, 1998b: 11), but it is also true that biryani and pulao today carry mainly the stamp of the Mughal times and its Persianized high culture.</ref>

Similarly Alexander the Great and his army, many centuries earlier, in the 4th century BCE, have been reported to be so impressed with Bactrian and Sogdian pilavs that his soldiers brought the recipes back to Macedonia when they returned. Similar stories exist of Alexander introducing pilaf to Samarkand; however, they are considered apocryphal by art historian John Boardman.

The earliest documented recipe for pilaf comes from the tenth-century Persian scholar Avicenna (Ibn Sīnā), who in his books on medical sciences dedicated a whole section to preparing various dishes, including several types of pilaf. In doing so, he described the advantages and disadvantages of every item used for preparing the dish. Accordingly, Persians consider Ibn Sina to be the "father" of modern pilaf. Thirteenth-century Arab texts describe the consistency of pilaf that the grains should be plump and somewhat firm to resemble peppercorns with no mushiness, and each grain should be separate with no clumping.

Another primary source for pilaf dishes comes from the 17th-century Iranian philosopher Molla Sadra.

Pilau became standard fare in the Middle East and Transcaucasia over the years with variations and innovations by the Persians, Arabs, Turks, and Armenians.

During the period of the Soviet Union, the Central Asian versions of the dish spread throughout all Soviet republics, becoming a part of the common Soviet cuisine.

Preparation
Some cooks prefer to use basmati rice because it is easier to prepare a pilaf where the grains stay "light, fluffy and separate" with this type of rice. However, other types of long-grain rice are also used. The rice is rinsed thoroughly before use to remove the surface starch. Pilaf can be cooked in water or stock. Common additions include fried onions and fragrant spices like cardamom, bay leaves and cinnamon. Pilaf is usually made with meat or vegetables, but it can also be made plain which is called sade pilav in Turkish, chelo in Persian and ruzz mufalfal in Arabic. On special occasions saffron may be used to give the rice a yellow color. Pilaf is often made by adding the rice to hot fat and stirring briefly before adding the cooking liquid. The fat used varies from recipe to recipe. Cooking methods vary with respect to details such as pre-soaking the rice and steaming after boiling.

Local varieties
There are thousands of variations of pilaf made with rice or other grains like bulgur. In Central Asia there are plov, pilau on the Indian subcontinent, and variations from Turkmenistan and Turkey. Some include different combinations of meats, fruits or vegetables, while others are simple and served plain. In the present day, Central Asian, Indian, Turkish cuisine, Iranian and Caribbean cuisine are considered the five major schools of pilaf.

 Afghanistan 

In Afghan cuisine, Kabuli palaw or Qabili pulao (Persian : قابلی پلو) is made by cooking basmati with mutton, lamb, beef or chicken, and oil. Kabuli palaw is cooked in large shallow and thick dishes. Fried sliced carrots and raisins are added. Chopped nuts like pistachios, walnuts, or almonds may be added as well. The meat is covered by the rice or buried in the middle of the dish. Kabuli palaw rice with carrots and raisins is very popular in Saudi Arabia, where it is known as roz Bukhari (Arabic: رز بخاري), meaning 'Bukharan rice'.

Armenia

Armenians use a lot of bulgur (cracked wheat) in their pilaf dishes. Armenian recipes may combine vermicelli or orzo with rice cooked in stock seasoned with mint, parsley and allspice. One traditional Armenian pilaf is made with the same noodle rice mixture cooked in stock with raisins, almonds and allspice.

Armenian kinds of rice are discussed by Rose Baboian in her cookbook from 1964 which includes recipes for different pilafs, most rooted in her birthplace of Antep in Turkey. Baboian recommends that the noodles be stir-fried first in chicken fat before being added to the pilaf. Another Armenian cookbook written by Vağinag Pürad recommends to render poultry fat in the oven with red pepper until the fat mixture turns a red color before using the strained fat to prepare pilaf.Lapa is an Armenian word with several meanings one of which is a "watery boiled rice, thick rice soup, mush" and lepe which refers to various rice dishes differing by region. Antranig Azhderian describes Armenian pilaf as "dish resembling porridge".

 Azerbaijan 
Azerbaijani cuisine includes more than 40 different plov recipes. One of the most reputed dishes is plov from saffron-covered rice, served with various herbs and greens, a combination distinctive from Uzbek plovs. Traditional Azerbaijani plov consists of three distinct components, served simultaneously but on separate platters: rice (warm, never hot), gara (fried beef or chicken pieces with onion, chestnut and dried fruits prepared as an accompaniment to rice), and aromatic herbs. Gara is put on the rice when eating plov, but it is never mixed with rice and the other components. Pilaf is usually called aş in Azerbaijani cuisine.

 Bangladesh 
In Bangladesh, pulao, fulao, or holao, is a popular ceremonial dish cooked only with aromatic rice. Bangladesh cultivates many varieties of aromatic rice which can be found only in this country and some surrounding Indian states with predominantly Bengali populations. Historically, there were many varieties of aromatic rice. These included short grained rice with buttery and other fragrances depending on the variety. Over a long span of time many recipes were lost and then reinvented.

Since the 1970s in Bangladesh pulao has referred to aromatic rice first fried either in oil or clarified butter with onions, fresh ginger and whole aromatic spices such as cardamom, cinnamon, black pepper and more depending on each household and region. This is then cooked in stock or water, first boiled and then steamed. It is finished off with a bit more clarified butter, and fragrant essences such as rose water or kewra water. For presentation, beresta (fried onions) are sprinkled on top. Chicken pulao, (morog pulao), is a traditional ceremonial dish among the Bangladeshi Muslim community. There are several different types of morog pulao found only in particular regions or communities.

In Sylhet and Chittagong, a popular ceremonial dish called akhni pulao, similar to the yakhni pulao of Northern India, yakhni or aqni being the rich stock in which mutton is cooked and then used to cook the rice. Another very spicy biryani dish very popular and unique to Bangladesh is called tehari. It is very different in taste to the teharis found in some parts of neighboring India. They are most popularly eaten with beef and chevon (goat meat) but are also paired with chicken. Young small potatoes, mustard oil (which is alternated with clarified butter or oil depending on individual taste), and a unique spice blend found in teharis distinguish them from other meat pulaos. The most famous tehari in the capital city of Dhaka is called hajir biryani. Although here the name biryani is a misnomer, in usage among the urban young population it differentiates the popular dish mutton biryanis (goat meat).

 Brazil 
Rice lightly fried (and optionally seasoned), salted and cooked until soft (but neither soupy nor sticky) in either water or chicken stock is added to chicken stock, onions and sometimes cubed bell peppers (cooked in the stock), shredded chicken breast, green peas, tomato sauce, shoyu, and optionally vegetables (e.g. canned sweet corn, cooked carrot cubes, courgette cubes, broccolini flowers, chopped broccoli or broccolini stalks or leaves fried in garlic seasoning) or herbs (e.g., mint, like in ) to form a distantly risotto-like dish – but it is generally fluffy (depending on the texture of the rice being added), as generally, once all ingredients are mixed, it is not left to cook longer than five minutes.

 Caribbean 

In the Eastern Caribbean and other Caribbean territories there are variations of pelau which include a wide range of ingredients such as pigeon peas, green peas, green beans, corn, carrots, pumpkin, and meat such as beef or chicken, or cured pig tail.  The seasoned meat is usually cooked in a stew, with the rice and other vegetables added afterwards. Coconut milk and spices are also key additions in some islands.

Trinidad is recognized for its pelau, a layered rice with meats and vegetables. It is a mix of traditional African cuisine and "New World" ingredients like ketchup. The process of browning the meat (usually chicken, but also stew beef or lamb) in sugar is an African technique.

In Tobago pelau is commonly made with crab.

 Central Asia 

Central Asian, e.g. Uzbek, Kyrgyz and Tajik  or osh differs from other preparations in that rice is not steamed, but instead simmered in a rich stew of meat and vegetables called zirvak (зирвак), until all the liquid is absorbed into the rice. A limited degree of steaming is commonly achieved by covering the pot. It is usually cooked in a kazon (or deghi) over an open fire. The cooking tradition includes many regional and occasional variations. Commonly, it is prepared with lamb, browned in lamb fat or oil, and then stewed with fried onions, garlic and carrots. Chicken palov is rare but found in traditional recipes originating in Bukhara. Palov is usually simply spiced with salt, peppercorns, and cumin, but coriander, barberries, red pepper, or marigold may be added according to regional variation or the chef's preference. Heads of garlic and chickpeas are buried into the rice during cooking. Sweet variations with dried apricots, cranberries and raisins are prepared on special occasions.

Although often prepared at home, palov is made on special occasions by an oshpaz or ashpoz (osh/ash master chef), who cooks it over an open flame, sometimes serving up to 1,000 people from a single cauldron on holidays or occasions such as weddings. Oshi nahor, or "morning palov", is served in the early morning (between 6 and 9 am) to large gatherings of guests, typically as part of an ongoing wedding celebration.

Uzbek-style palov is found in the post-Soviet countries and Xinjiang Uyghur Autonomous Region of China. In Xinjiang, where the dish is known as polu, it is often served with pickled vegetables, including carrots, onion and tomato.

 Greece 
In Greek cuisine, piláfi (πιλάφι) is fluffy and soft, but neither soupy nor sticky, rice that has been boiled in a meat stock or bouillon broth. In Northern Greece, it is considered improper to prepare piláfi on a stovetop; the pot is properly placed in the oven. Gamopílafo ("wedding pilaf") is the prized pilaf served traditionally at weddings and major celebrations in Crete: rice is boiled in lamb or goat broth, then finished with lemon juice. Although it bears the name, Gamopílafo is not a pilaf but rather a kind of risotto, with creamy and not fluffy texture.

 India Pulao is usually a mixture of either lentils or vegetables, mainly including peas, potatoes, green beans, carrots or meat, mainly chicken, fish, lamb, goat, pork or prawn with rice. A typical Bengali style pulao is prepared using vegetarian ingredients like Long grain rice or aromatic rice, cashewnut, raisin, saffron, ghee and various spices like nutmeg, bay leaf, cinnamon, cardamom, cumin, clove and mace. There are also few very elaborate pulaos with Persianized names like hazar pasand ("a thousand delights"). It is usually served on special occasions and weddings, though it is not uncommon to eat it for a regular lunch or dinner meal. It is considered very high in food energy and fat. A pulao is often complemented with either spiced yogurt or raita.

 Iran 

Persian culinary terms referring to rice preparation are numerous and have found their way into the neighbouring languages: polow (rice cooked in broth while the grains remain separate, straining the half cooked rice before adding the broth and then "brewing"), chelow (white rice with separate grains), kateh (sticky rice) and tahchin (slow cooked rice, vegetables, and meat cooked in a specially designed dish). There are also varieties of different rice dishes with vegetables and herbs which are very popular among Iranians.

There are four primary methods of cooking rice in Iran:
 Chelow: rice that is carefully prepared through soaking and parboiling, at which point the water is drained and the rice is steamed. This method results in an exceptionally fluffy rice with the grains separated and not sticky; it also results in a golden rice crust at the bottom of the pot called tahdig (literally "bottom of the pot").
 Polow: rice that is cooked exactly the same as chelo, with the exception that after draining the rice, other ingredients are layered with the rice, and they are then steamed together.
 Kateh: rice that is boiled until the water is absorbed. This is the traditional dish of Northern Iran.
 Damy: cooked almost the same as kateh, except that the heat is reduced just before boiling and a towel is placed between the lid and the pot to prevent steam from escaping. Damy literally means "simmered".

 Pakistan 

In Pakistan, pulao is a popular dish cooked with basmati rice and meat, usually either mutton or beef. pulao is a rice dish, cooked in seasoned broth with rice, meat, and an array of spices including: coriander seeds, cumin, cardamom, cloves and others. As with Afghan cuisine, Kabuli palaw is a staple dish in the western part of the Pakistan, and this style of pulao is often embellished with sliced carrots, almonds and raisins, fried in a sweet syrup.
Bannu Beef Pulao, also known as Bannu Gosht Pulao, is a traditional and popular variation of Pulao recipe hailing from the Bannu district of the Khyber Pakhtunkhwa province in Pakistan. The dish is made with tender beef, aromatic rice, and a blend of local spices, resulting in a rich and robust taste. The beef is first cooked in a separate preparation known as Beef Yakhni, made using a combination of salt, ginger, garlic, onions, and garam masala. This adds an additional depth of flavor to the dish. The beef and rice are then combined, creating a deliciously savory and satisfying dish. This delicacy is often served during special occasions and family dinners and is a staple of the Pashtun culinary tradition. The dish is known for its unique spiciness and beefy flavor, making it a sought-after delicacy among food enthusiasts.

Pulao is famous in all parts of Pakistan, but the cooking style can vary slightly in other parts of the country. It is prepared by Sindhi people of Pakistan in their marriage ceremonies, condolence meetings, and other occasions.

Levant
Traditional Levantine cooking includes a variety of Pilaf known as "Maqlubeh", known across the countries of the Eastern Mediterranean. The rice pilaf which is traditionally cooked with meats, eggplants, tomatoes, potatoes, and cauliflower also has a fish variety known as "Sayyadiyeh", or the Fishermen's Dish.

Turkey

Historically, mutton stock was the most common cooking liquid for Turkish pilafs, which according to 19th century American sources was called pirinç.

Turkish cuisine contains many different pilaf types. Some of these variations are pirinc (rice) pilaf, bulgur pilaf, and arpa şehriye (orzo) pilaf. Using mainly these three types, Turkish people make many dishes such as perdeli pilav, and etli pilav (rice cooked with cubed beef). Unlike Chinese rice, if Turkish rice is sticky, it is considered unsuccessful. To make the best rice according to Turkish people, one must rinse the rice, cook in butter, then add the water and let it sit until it soaks all the water. This results in a pilaf that is not sticky and every single rice grain falls off of the spoon separately.

Lithuania and the Baltics
Lithuanian pilaf is often referred to as plovas, it tends to consist of rice and vegetables, depending on the region the vegetables can be tomatoes, carrots, cabbage, and or mushroom, it tends to consist of chicken pieces or cut-up pieces of pig, usually the meat around the neck or around the stomach, seasonings can be heavy or light and some plovas can consist of rice that is really soft, unlike some variants.

Latvian pilaf is often referred to as plovs or plow, it tends to contain the same ingredients as the Lithuanian plovas and can vary from county to county.

The Greek Orthodox Pontian minority had their own methods of preparing pilav. Pontians along the Black Sea coast might make pilav with anchovies (called ) or mussels (called ). Other varieties of Pontian pilav could include chicken, lamb, and vegetables. Typical seasonings are anise, dill, parsley, salt, pepper, and saffron. Some Pontians cooked pine nuts, peanuts, or almonds into their pilav. While pilav was usually made from rice, it could also be made with buckwheat.

See also

 Nasi kebuli, a similar dish from Indonesia
 List of rice dishes
 Fried rice
 Nasi lemak Nasi goreng''

References

Notes

Bibliography

External links

 
 
 
 

Ancient dishes
Rice dishes
African cuisine
Armenian cuisine
Balkan cuisine
Caucasian cuisine
Central Asian cuisine
French cuisine
Iranian cuisine
Iraqi cuisine
Israeli cuisine
Jewish cuisine
Kazakhstani cuisine
Kyrgyz cuisine
Kurdish cuisine
Latin American cuisine
Middle Eastern cuisine
Ottoman cuisine
Pakistani cuisine
South Asian cuisine
Soviet cuisine
Tajik cuisine
Turkmenistan cuisine
Uzbek dishes
Pontic Greek cuisine
Romani cuisine
World cuisine
Types of food
Street food
Indian rice dishes
Azerbaijani cuisine